These are the results for the Individual jumping event at the 2018 Summer Youth Olympics.

Schedule 
All times are local (UTC−3).

Results

Rounds A and B

Jump-off

References

External links
Round A
Round B
Jump-off

Equestrian at the 2018 Summer Youth Olympics